Hill v Tupper (1863) is an English land law case which did not find an easement in a commercial agreement, in this case, related to boat hire. Here, the agreed "exclusive" right was held not to be benefitting the land itself, but just for the business. It could not therefore be enforced directly against third parties competing.

Facts
The Basingstoke Canal Co gave Hill an exclusive contractual licence in his lease of Aldershot Wharf, Cottage and Boathouse to hire boats out. Hill did so regularly. Mr Tupper also occasionally allowed customers to use his boats by his Aldershot Inn to bathe or fish in the canal.  Hill wished to stop Tupper from doing so. He sued Tupper, arguing that his lease gave him an exclusive easement and so a direct right to enforce it against third parties (rather than mere licence).

Judgment
Pollock CB held that the contract did not create any legal property right, and so there was no duty on Mr Tupper. If Hill wanted to stop Tupper, he would have to force the Canal Company to assert its property right against Tupper.

An easement would not be recognised. The benefit of an easement must be for the land. Here, the right to exclusive use of the canal was not for benefitting the land itself, but just for the business.

 
Bramwell and Martin  concurred.

See also

English trusts law
English property law

Notes

References
N Gravells (ed), Landmark Cases in Land Law (2013)

English land case law
Court of Exchequer Chamber cases
1863 in British law
1863 in case law